Gavin Gerald Fink (born September 19, 1992) is an American actor.

External links

1992 births
American male child actors
American male film actors
American male television actors
Living people
Male actors from Newport Beach, California
21st-century American male actors